The 132nd Pennsylvania Volunteer Infantry was an infantry regiment that served in the Union Army during the American Civil War.

Service
The 132nd Pennsylvania Infantry was organized at Harrisburg, Pennsylvania, in August 1862 and mustered in under the command of Colonel Richard A. Oakford.

The regiment was attached to 1st Brigade, 3rd Division, II Corps, Army of the Potomac, to November 1862. 2nd Brigade, 3rd Division, II Corps, to May 1863.

The 132nd Pennsylvania Infantry mustered out May 24, 1863.

Detailed service
Moved to Washington, D.C., August 19, and performed duty there until September 2. Ordered to Rockville, Md., September 2. Maryland Campaign September 6-22, 1862. Battle of Antietam, Md., September 16-17. Moved to Harpers Ferry, Va., September 22, and duty there until October 30. Reconnaissance to Leesburg October 1-2. Advanced up Loudon Valley and movement to Falmouth, Va., October 30-November 17. Battle of Fredericksburg December 12-15. Duty at Falmouth until April 27. Chancellorsville Campaign April 27-May 6. Battle of Chancellorsville May 1-5.

Casualties
The regiment lost a total of 113 men during service; 3 officers and 70 enlisted men killed or mortally wounded, 40 enlisted men died of disease.

Commanders
 Colonel Richard A. Oakford- killed in action at the Battle of Antietam
 Colonel Vincent M. Wilcox - discharged January 24, 1863 due to disability
 Colonel Charles Albright

See also

 List of Pennsylvania Civil War Units
 Pennsylvania in the Civil War

References
 Dyer, Frederick H. A Compendium of the War of the Rebellion (Des Moines, IA:  Dyer Pub. Co.), 1908.
 Fourth Re-union of the Regimental Association of the 132d Pennsylvania Volunteers, Antietam, Md., September 17th, 1891 (S.l.: The Regimental Association), 1891.
 Hitchcock, Frederick L. War from the Inside; or, Personal Experiences, Impressions, and Reminiscences of One of the "Boys" in the War of the Rebellion (Philadelphia: Press of J. B. Lippincott Co.), 1904. [reprinted in 1985]
 Wilcox, Vincent M. Address Delivered at the First Re-union of the Regiment on the 26th Anniversary of the Battle of Antietam at Danville, Pennsylvania, September 17th, 1888 (New York: A. B. King), 1888.
Attribution

External links
 132nd Pennsylvania Infantry monument at Antietam

Military units and formations established in 1862
Military units and formations disestablished in 1863
Units and formations of the Union Army from Pennsylvania
1862 establishments in Pennsylvania